John J. Mahoney is an American politician who represents the 13th Worcester District in the Massachusetts House of Representatives.

See also
 2019–2020 Massachusetts legislature
 2021–2022 Massachusetts legislature

References

Democratic Party members of the Massachusetts House of Representatives
Politicians from Worcester, Massachusetts
Bryant University alumni
Living people
21st-century American politicians
Year of birth missing (living people)